Conservation Strategy Fund (CSF) is a global conservation organization headquartered in Washington, D.C., with country offices in Bolivia, Brazil, Peru, Indonesia, and Kenya.

Achievements 

Achievements include helping to establish 1.5 million acres of protected area in central Brazil, helping local people divert the construction of a road through Volcán Barú National Park in Panama, successfully preventing construction of a dam that would have flooded significant portions of Madidi National Park in Bolivia, and delaying the paving of highway BR-319 in the Brazilian Amazon which, without proper safeguards, could have inflicted harm on the world's largest rainforest.

References

External links 

 Official website

Nature conservation organizations based in the United States
Non-profit organizations based in Washington, D.C.